Mee Seva is a Government-to-citizen (G2C) and citizen-to-Government (C2G) services provided by the Government of Telangana . The service provides  over 150 government services, payments to be made online, at service centers, or through the app. The Electronic services delivery (ESD) provide 40 government departments and 600 private related services. The service completed 10 crore transactions in February 2018. After the state formation, 7.5 crore transactions and 10-12 crores a day were recorded in 3 years 4 months. Telangana stood top in India in digital transactions volume. The software is developed and supported by Telangana State Technology Service (TSTS).

History
MeeSeva was launched in Chittoor district in Andhra Pradesh, India on 4 November 2011 offering 10 services to the citizens. After formation of Telangana State in June 2014, the services were bifurcated.

Services
The services are offered at 4758 franchise centers across 31 districts in the state. The user charges/profits are shared in a 9:1 ratio; 10 per cent profit goes to the government and 90 per cent to the licensed franchisee. It is transacting about 1,50,000 a day by February 2018.

Mee Seva services is being used to help speed up passport issue on a pilot basis, once successful it will be rolled out across the state.

Pattadar Passbook service for completing aadhar seeding was also given to MeeSeva service providers on 12 April 2018. They can update biometrics for the aadhar account by using eKYC method.

T App Folio
An integrated app, as a part of Mee Seva 2.0, that provides services like 180 services in one app, services like Mee Seva services, RTA services, fee payments, bill payment services etc. are all bundled into one. It was launched on 28 February 2018 by IT minister of Telangana, K. T. Rama Rao. The T app folio is similar to Government of India’s, UMANG. The government plans to bring on-board all mobile apps of its various departments to T App Folio by January 2019. The app also provide informational services, location services like MeeSeva centers, Ration shops, Hy-Fi hotspots.

Awards
 WITSA Chairman’s Award at the World Congress IT held in Hyderabad in February 2018.

References

External links
 Official site

Government of Telangana
KCR Government initiatives
E-government in India